Patrick Boland may refer to:

Patrick J. Boland (1880–1942), US representative for Pennsylvania
Patrick Boland (Irish politician), Irish Fianna Fáil politician